George Herbert Morrell MA, MP, JP, DL (1845, Adderbury – 30 September 1906, Bad Nauheim) was an English politician and lawyer.

George Herbert Morrell was the son of the Rev. G. K. Morrell, fellow of St John's College, Oxford. He was educated at Rugby School and Exeter College, Oxford, where he took honours in natural science as well as a B.C.L. in 1870. Morrell became a demonstrator in physiology at the Oxford university museum under George Rolleston. In 1874 he married his third cousin, Emilia Alicia Morrell (1854–1938), granddaughter of one of the founder of Morrells Brewery and the richest heiress in Oxfordshire. He was the Conservative Member of Parliament for Woodstock, from 1891 to 1892 and again from 1895 till 1906.

References

External links 
 

1845 births
1906 deaths
People from Oxfordshire
People educated at Rugby School
Alumni of Exeter College, Oxford
Conservative Party (UK) MPs for English constituencies
UK MPs 1886–1892
UK MPs 1895–1900
UK MPs 1900–1906
English justices of the peace
Deputy Lieutenants